The Credit River is a river in southern Ontario, which flows from headwaters above the Niagara Escarpment near Orangeville and Caledon East to empty into Lake Ontario at Port Credit, Mississauga.

Despite urbanization and associated problems with water quality on the lower section of this river, it provides spawning areas for Chinook salmon and rainbow trout. There is a fish ladder on the river at Streetsville. Much of the river can still be travelled by canoe or kayak. The headwaters of the Credit River is home to a native self-sustaining brook trout population and an introduced brown trout population.

Credit Valley Conservation, the local watershed management conservation authority, operates several Conservation Areas including Belfountain, Island Lake, and Terra Cotta.

Forks of the Credit Provincial Park is located on the upper part of the river between Brampton and Orangeville, and is near the Bruce Trail.

Communities in the river's watershed include the following:

City of Brampton
City of Mississauga
Township of Amaranth
Town of Caledon
Township of East Garafraxa
Town of Halton Hills
Town of Mono
Town of Orangeville

Naming
The river became known as Missinnihe (Eastern Ojibwa: "trusting creek") to the Mississaugas First Nation who met annually with white traders there. To the First Nations, the river was "held in reverential estimation as the favourite resort of their ancestors" and the band, which ranged from Long Point on Lake Erie to the Rouge River on Lake Ontario, became known as the Credit River Indians. Their descendants are today the Mississaugas of the New Credit First Nation.

The origins of the English name come from the time when French fur traders supplied goods to the native people in advance (on credit) against furs which would be delivered the following spring. It was known as the Rivière au Crédit. The trading post was set up at the mouth of the river, in Port Credit, in the early 18th century.

Watershed population and land use
As of the 2006 census, 750,000 people live in the watershed. Of those, 87 percent live in the lower third of the watershed. Population growth is approximately 3 percent per year. In 1999, 21 percent of the watershed was developed. By 2020, 40 percent of the watershed will be developed (based on approved development and the official plans of the municipalities).

Plants and animals
The Credit River is home to a wide range of wildlife. Some species are permanent or seasonal residents while others are sighted occasionally. This watershed is home to 1,330 plant species, 64 fish species (including many bait fish, pike, and brook trout), 41 mammal species, 5 turtle species, 8 snake species, 17 amphibian species, and 244 bird species.

Turtle species (5) 

 Common snapping turtle, Chelydra serpentina
 Midland painted turtle, Chrysemys picta marginata
 Red-eared slider, Trachemys scripta elegans
 Blanding's turtle, Emydoidea blandingii
 Common map turtle, Graptemys geographica

Snake species (8) 

 Eastern garter snake, Thamnophis sirtalis sirtalis
 Northern redbelly snake, Storeria occipitomaculata
 Northern brown snake, Storeria dekayi
 Northern ringneck snake, Diadophis punctatus edwardsii
 Eastern milk snake, Lampropeltis triangulum triangulum
 Northern water snake, Nerodia sipedon
 Smooth green snake, Opheodrys vernalis
 Northern ribbon snake, Thamnophis sauritus septentrionalis

Amphibian species (17) 

 Common mudpuppy, Necturus maculosus maculosus
 Red-spotted newt (eastern), Notophthalmus viridescens
 Jefferson salamander, Ambystoma jeffersonianum
 "Silvery salamander"
 "Tremblay's salamander"
 Blue-spotted salamander, Ambystoma laterale
 Northern redback salamander, Plethodon cinereus
 Four-toed salamander, Hemidactylium scutatum
 Spotted salamander, Ambystoma maculatum
 Eastern American toad, Anaxyrus americanus americanus
 Northern spring peeper, Pseudacris crucifer crucifer
 Tetraploid grey treefrog, Hyla versicolor
 Striped chorus frog (western), Pseudacris triseriata triseriata
 Wood frog, Lithobates sylvaticus
 Northern leopard frog, Lithobates pipiens
 Pickerel frog, Lithobates palustris
 Green frog, Lithobates clamitans
 Mink frog, Lithobates septentrionalis
 Bullfrog, Lithobates catesbeianus

In popular culture
The Canadian indie rock band The Constantines entitled a track "Credit River" on their 2008 album Kensington Heights.

Bridges

List of major roadways crossing over the Credit in Peel Region:

 Lakeshore Road - 4 lane steel box girder bridge
 Queen Elizabeth Way - two span open spandrel deck arch bridges built in 1934 and widened 1960; maybe demolished and replaced pending review
 Dundas Street West - two separate span steel box girder bridges
 Burnhamthorpe Road West - two separate span concrete bridges
 Ontario Highway 403 - 8 lane concrete girder overpass(es)
 Eglinton Avenue West - two separate span concrete bridges 
 a lower small steel truss bridge for pedestrian trail visible from the north side 
 Bristol Road West - two lane concrete girder bridge
 Britannia Road - 4 lane concrete overpass
 Creditview Road - concrete overpass being widened with new span to accommodate 4 lanes
 Ontario Highway 401 - 6 lane concrete girder overpasses
 Old Derry Road West - two lane steel Warren truss bridge (c. 1930 and rehabilitated in 2005)
 Derry Road - 6 lane concrete overpass
 Ontario Highway 407 - two separate span 8 lane concrete girder overpasses
 Steeles Avenue West - 4 lane concrete girder overpass
 Creditview Road - single lane concrete bowstring bridge c. 1928
 Mississauga Road - 4 lane concrete girder overpass near Queen Street in Brampton
 Heritage Road - 2 lane concrete overpass
 Ontario Highway 7 / Guelph Street - 2 lane overpass

Most of the bridges were built in the mid-20th century or later. Only the Queen Elizabeth Way and Old Derry Road West bridges are older.

CP Rail and CN Rail have steel deck truss bridges crossing over the Credit River.

See also
List of Ontario rivers
Wilbur Lake

References

Sources

External links

Fishing the Credit River Steelhead, Salmon and Trout
Credit Valley Conservation

 
Rivers of Dufferin County
Tributaries of Lake Ontario
Rivers of Mississauga